
The surname Keith has several origins. In some cases it is derived from Keith in East Lothian, Scotland. In other cases the surname is originated from a nickname, derived from the Middle High German kīt, a word meaning "sprout", "offspring".

List of persons with the surname

A
 Arthur Berriedale Keith (1879–1944), Scottish constitutional lawyer and Sanskrit scholar
 Agnes Keith (disambiguation), several people
 Alan Keith (1908–2003), British radio presenter
 Alexander Keith (disambiguation), several people
 R. Alexandra Keith (born 1967/1968), American businesswoman
 Allison Keith (born 1974), American actor and voice actor
 Arthur Keith (1866–1955), Scottish anatomist and anthropologist
 Arthur Keith (geologist) (1864–1944), American geologist

B
 Ben Keith (fl. 1950-1960s), American musician
 Ben E. Keith, American businessman
 Benjamin Franklin Keith (1846–1914), American vaudeville theatre owner
 Bill Keith (disambiguation), several people
 Brandon Keith (born 1984), American football player
 Brian Keith (1921–1997), American actor

C
 Carl D. Keith (1920–2008), American chemist and inventor
 Charles A. Keith, American football, basketball and baseball coach
 Charles H. Keith, American music publisher
 Charles S. Keith (1873–1945), American businessman and politician
 Charlton Keith (born 1982), American football player
 Craig Keith (born 1971), American football player

D
 Damon Keith (1922–2019), American jurist
 David Keith (born 1954), American actor and director
 Donald Keith (author), pseudonym of an American writing team, Donald and Keith Monroe
 Donald R. Keith (1927–2004), United States Army general
 Duncan Keith (born 1983), Canadian ice hockey player

E
 Eartha Kitt, born Eartha Keith (1927-2008), American singer and actress
 Eliza D. Keith (1854-1939), American educator, suffragist, journalist
 Elmer Keith (1899–1984), American firearm enthusiast
 Eoin Keith, Irish ultramarathon runner

F
 Farley Keith (born 1962), American music producer and disc jockey
 Francis Edward James Keith, Scottish military leader

G
 Geoff Keith (1937–1975), British cricketer
 George Keith (disambiguation), several people
 Gillian Keith (born 1972), Canadian musician
 Gordon Keith (radio host) (fl. 1990-2000s), American radio personality

H
 Hamish Keith (born 1936), New Zealand art scholar
 Harold Keith (1903–1998), American author
 Harry Keith (1899–1982), British forester and plant collector
 Hastings Keith (1915–2005), American politician
 Headley Keith (1927–1997), South African cricketer
 Henry Keith (disambiguation), several people

I
 Ian Keith (1899–1960), American actor
 Isabelle Keith (1898–1979), American film actress

J
 James Keith (disambiguation), several people
 Jeff Keith (born 1958), American musician
 Jeremy Keith (fl. 1990-2000s), British football club manager and owner
 Jim Keith (1949–1999), American author
 Joe Keith (born 1978), British footballer
 John Keith (disambiguation), several people

K
 Kenneth Keith (born 1937), New Zealand jurist
 Kenneth Keith, Baron Keith of Castleacre, British businessman
 Kenton Keith (born 1980), Canadian football player
 Kenton Keith (diplomat) (fl. 1990s), American ambassador
 Kevin Keith (born 1963), American prisoner
 Kool Keith (fl. 1990-2000s), American hip hop artist

L
 Leslie Keith (1906–1977), American musician
 Lierre Keith (born 1964), American writer, radical feminist, food activist, and radical environmentalist
 Lisa Keith (fl. 1980-2000s), American musician

M
 Marino Keith (born 1974), Scottish footballer
 Marlise Keith (born 1972), South African artist
 Matt Keith (born 1983), Canadian ice hockey player
 Max Keith (fl. 1930-1940s), German businessman with Coca-Cola Company
 Miguel Keith (1951–1970), American Marine posthumously awarded the Medal of Honor
 Mike Keith (disambiguation), several people
 Minor C. Keith (1848–1929), American shipping and railroad businessman

N
 Nathaniel S. Keith (1838–1925), American engineer and scientist

P
 Penelope Keith (born 1940), British actress

R
 Richard Keith (disambiguation), several people
 Robert Keith (disambiguation), several people
 Rodd Keith (1937–1974), American musician and songwriter

S
 Sam Keith (1921–2003), American author

 Sandra Keith (born 1980), Canadian Olympics athlete
 Shannon Keith (fl. 1990-2000s), American animal rights activist
 Sheila Keith (1920–2004), British television and film actress
 Slim Keith (1917–1990), American socialite and fashion icon
 Stuart Keith (1931–2003), British ornithologist

T
 Timothy Z. Keith (fl. 1970-2000s), American psychologist
 Toby Keith (born 1961), American country singer, songwriter, actor, and record producer.
 Tom Keith (1946-2011), American radio engineer and radio personality
 Trever Keith (born 1969), American musician and music producer

V
 Vicki Keith (born 1961), Canadian swimmer

W
 Warren Keith (fl. 1990-2000s), American film actor
 Willard Keith (1920–1942), World War II United States Marine Corps captain
 William Keith (disambiguation), several people

Z
 Zak Keith (fl. 1990-2000s), British-born Swedish musician

See also
 Justice Keith (disambiguation)
 Baron Keith, a line of Scottish barons in the late 18th century
 Clan Keith, Scottish clan associated with lands in northeastern and northwestern Scotland
 Sam Kieth (born 1963), American comics writer and illustrator and film director

Surnames
English-language surnames
Scottish surnames

fr:Keith